The ATP Salzburg Indoors is a professional tennis tournament played on indoor hard courts. It is currently part of the Tretorn SERIE+ of Association of Tennis Professionals (ATP) Challenger Tour. It has been held annually in Salzburg, Austria since 2009.

Past finals

Singles

Doubles

External links
ITF search

 
Salzburg Indoors
Hard court tennis tournaments
Indoor tennis tournaments
Recurring sporting events established in 2009
Sports in Salzburg
Tennis tournaments in Austria
Tretorn SERIE+ tournaments